Sakhigopal railway station is a railway station on the East Coast Railway network in the state of Odisha, India. It serves Sakhigopal village. Its code is SIL. It has four platforms. Passenger, MEMU, Express trains halt at Sakhigopal railway station.

Major trains

 Puri Baidyanath Dham Express
 Puri–Kamakhya Weekly Express (via Howrah)
 Sri Jagannath Express
 Puri–Howrah Express
 Kalinga Utkal Express
 Puri–Barbil Express
 Paradeep–Puri Intercity Express
 Howrah–Puri Express
 Puri–Ahmedabad Express
 Puri–Ahmedabad Weekly Express
 Puri–Jodhpur Express
 Puri–Okha Dwarka Express
 Gandhidham–Puri Weekly Express
 Neelachal Express
 Puri–Tirupati Express
 Puri-Chennai Express

See also
 Puri district

References

Railway stations in Puri district
Khurda Road railway division